Glamorgan may refer to the following places:

in Australia
 Glamorgan-Spring Bay Council, the municipality covering the southern east coast of Tasmania, Australia
 Municipality of Glamorgan, former municipality

in Canada
 Glamorgan, Calgary, a neighbourhood of Calgary, Alberta, Canada

in Trinidad and Tobago
 Glamorgan, Tobago, a village in Tobago, Trinidad and Tobago
in Wales
 Glamorgan (or Glamorganshire), traditional county of Wales (United Kingdom)
Glamorgan or Glamorganshire may also refer to the following political constituencies:

 Glamorganshire (UK Parliament constituency), 1536-1885

East Glamorganshire (UK Parliament constituency), 1885-1918
Mid Glamorganshire (UK Parliament constituency), 1885-1918
South Glamorganshire (UK Parliament constituency), 1885-1918

in the United States
 Glamorgan (Deer Park, Maryland), listed on the NRHP in Maryland
 Glamorgan (Alliance, Ohio), listed on the NRHP in Stark County, Ohio
Glamorgan, Virginia

Glamorgan is also the name for:
 HMS Glamorgan, a Royal Navy County-class destroyer, launched in 1964 and decommissioned in 1986
 The University of Glamorgan
 Glamorgan (The Toorak Preparatory Grammar School), a prep. school affiliated with Geelong Church of England Grammar School
 SS Glamorgan Coast, which ran aground off Cape Cornwall in 1932.

In sport Glamorgan may refer to:
 Glamorgan Wanderers RFC, a rugby union club based in Cardiff, Wales
 Glamorgan County RFC, a rugby union invitational team based in South Wales
 Glamorgan County Silver Ball Trophy, a rugby union tournament
 Glamorgan County Cricket Club, a county cricket team representing the County of Glamorgan

For the Wikimedia tool meta:GLAMorgan